James Bay is a high density neighbourhood of Victoria, British Columbia, Canada. It is the oldest residential neighbourhood on the West coast of North America that is north of San Francisco.  James Bay occupies the south side of the Inner Harbour close to downtown.  Access to the neighbourhood is along Belleville Street, Government Street, Douglas Street and Dallas Road.

History 
The original inhabitants of James Bay were the Swenghwung people who were part of the Lekwungen people of the Coast Salish and whose descendants today are known as the Songhees First Nation.  Even after the Indigenous inhabitants allegedly  sold the land to the Hudson's Bay Company, remains of fortifications at Holland Point and of burial grounds at Laurel Point remained.  The neighbourhood takes its name from the shallow inlet James Bay that forms part of Victoria's Inner Harbour, named for James Douglas. Settled early after the establishment of Fort Victoria in 1843, much of the present day neighbourhood was originally part of Ogden's Fields Farms, subsequently known as Dutnall's Farm and then Beckley Farm.

Residential development of James Bay began in 1859 when Governor Douglas decided to construct the colonial administration offices for the Colony of Vancouver Island across the harbour from Fort Victoria.  Known as the Birdcages because of their somewhat fanciful design, the Birdcages were replaced in 1898 by Francis Mawson Rattenbury's Parliament Buildings, which still serve as the meeting place of the Legislative Assembly of British Columbia.

Between the construction of the Birdcages in 1859 and the completion of the Parliament Buildings in 1897, a considerable amount of residential development took place in James Bay. The family home of James and Amelia Douglas stood on the location of the present Royal British Columbia Museum, behind which is located the house of John Sebastian Helmcken, the colony's first doctor, speaker of the Assembly, and son-in-law of the governor. The Victorian Italianate childhood home of Canadian artist Emily Carr, built in 1863, stands on Government Street, formerly known as Carr Street, in an area of numerous mainly modest wooden homes that date to the later decades of the nineteenth century. Grander homes in James Bay include the Pendray residence on Belleville Street, built in the Queen Anne style in 1897 for William and Amelia Pendray who originally made a fortune in the Cariboo Gold Rush and later opened a soap factory at Laurel Point. and Pinehurst, another Queen Anne style residence built in 1890 on Battery Street for William James MacAulay, a retired American lumber baron and banker. The architect of Pinehurst and of many other residences in James Bay was Thomas Hooper, whose own modest residence stands at 243 Kingston Street. After its demolition in 1944, part of the grounds became Macdonald Park.

In addition to government offices, the James Bay area was also home to a number of industries, including Sehl's furniture factory at Laurel Point, Pendray's Soap Factory, and later Bapco Paint.  Marine-oriented industries have included Laing's shipyard (where Fisherman's Wharf is located today) in the 1860s as well as a shipping terminal, flour mill, chemical plant and warehouses along the water between Laurel Point and Ogden Point.  At the Inner Harbour the Canadian Pacific Railway had a steamship terminal, designed by Rattenbury and Percy James, built in 1924 in a Greek temple style and occupied since 1969 by the Royal London Wax Museum.
 
The Canadian Government maintained immigration facilities in the late nineteenth century, replaced with the Dominion Immigration Building, a brick building at Dallas Road and Ontario Street, in 1908.  This building has been demolished.

In 1900 the wooden bridge across the tidal flats of James Bay was replaced with a stone causeway, allowing the mud flats to be filled in and the Empress Hotel to be constructed in 1908 for the Canadian Pacific Railway.

The construction of South Park Elementary School in 1914 largely marked the close of the building boom in James Bay until the 1960s, when demolition of many of the older buildings made room for the construction of a number of apartment blocks, some, like Orchard House on Michigan Street as high as twenty stories.  The threatened destruction of further older homes gave rise to a grassroots heritage preservation effort.

James Bay today 
Fisherman's Wharf remains an active marina, and the outer harbour today is further ringed by a heliport, coast guard facilities and cruise ship terminal at Ogden Point.  A commercial area, named “James Bay Village”,  is centred on the intersection of Menzies and Simcoe Streets.  The Inner Harbour area continues to be dominated by the Legislature Buildings and ancillary government offices along Superior Street, but is also the hub of Victoria's tourist industry with the Royal British Columbia Museum and the adjacent Empress Hotel serving as focal points for visitors to the city.

Climate 

Victoria has a  Mediterranean climate (Csb), with mild rainy winters and cool dry summers.

The weather in the City of Victoria may vary greatly from neighbourhood to neighbourhood.  For instance, James Bay which is surrounded on three sides by the ocean, is typically 3 to 5 degrees Celsius (5 to 10 °F) cooler in summer than more inland areas of Victoria.  In winter, James Bay is typically a few degrees warmer than other parts of Victoria.  It therefore receives significantly less snow than other parts of Greater Victoria.  Current weather temperatures are reported by the University of Victoria School-based weather station located at James Bay elementary school on Oswego Street.

Places of interest

Parks
City parks in the James Bay neighbourhood include:
Beacon Hill Park
Fisherman's Wharf Park including Fisherman's Wharf (fishing vessels, fresh fish, fish and chips, etc.)
Holland Point Park, ocean side of Dallas Road below the foot of Government St. (between Lewis St. and Paddon Ave.)
Irving Park
Laurel Point Park
MacDonald Park
South Park

Historic buildings and attractions
The James Bay neighbourhood has many historical landmarks and a number of tourist attractions:

British Columbia Legislature Buildings, Belleville St. between Government St. and Menzies St.
Emily Carr House
Helmcken House, pioneer doctor's residence, 638 Elliott St. (immediately east of the Royal British Columbia Museum)
Mile '0' of the Trans-Canada Highway, Douglas Street at Dallas Road
Orchard House (Michigan Street), currently the tallest building in Greater Victoria
Ogden Point: cruise ship terminal and HeliJet terminal
Royal British Columbia Museum, Belleville St. between Government St. and Douglas St. (just east of the British Columbia Parliament Buildings)
United States ferries terminal: Coho Ferry, Victoria Clipper, etc.

Other points of land
Clover Point, processed waste water and storm water outfall ocean side of Dallas Road between Moss St. and Bushby St.
Finlayson Point, ocean side of Dallas Road due south of Beacon Hill Park lookout
Horseshoe Bay, a small sandy cove immediately to the west of Finlayson Point
Victoria Point, a small point of land ocean side of Dallas Road below the foot of Douglas St.

References

External links
James Bay Neighbourhood Association
James Bay Athletic Association

Neighbourhoods in Victoria, British Columbia